Adam Eckersley is a singer, guitarist and songwriter from Grafton, Australia. He is the former vocalist and lead guitarist of award-winning blues band Bluezone, which have since disbanded. He has also been recently been signed to Universal Music Australia, Eckersley is married to fellow musician, Australian country music singer–songwriter Brooke McClymont, of The McClymonts.

Early life
Born and raised in Grafton, Australia and later moved to Tamworth, New South Wales after graduating from Mcauley Catholic College in 1999 along with his two brothers, Mark and Ryan. Eckersley currently resides on the Mid North Coast, New South Wales.

Career
Eckersley has been playing professionally for many years and was the 2008 ambassador for the Australian Blues Music Festival. Eckersley is sponsored by Fender Australia and Lee Oskar Harmonicas.
Having played at some of the countries leading blues festivals including the Byron Bay Blues & Roots Festival and the Darling Harbour Jazz Festival, he has also shared the stage with Australia's most revered guitarists such as; Phil Emmanuel, Mal Eastick, Phil Manning & Matt Taylor from Chain, Kevin Borich, and Izzy Ismanovich of The Screaming Jets.

In early 2010, Eckersley formed the 5 piece band Adam Eckersley Band (A.E.B.), consisting of Adam Eckersley, Jason Bone, Rudy Miranda, Ammiel Warner and Scott Greenway, they are now touring extensively throughout New South Wales. The release of their EP and first studio album has been met with positive feedback and sales, which also includes cover art designed by Eckersley.

Eckersley accompanied The McClymonts on their extensive 2011 US tour, performing alongside them as rhythm guitarist, while also developing A.E.B.

In mid 2012, Eckersley received much interest from key figures within Universal Music Australia after seeing him perform in one of The McClymonts music video's. Soon after, Eckersley was signed to his first major label and writing music with numerous notable artists such as Keith Peterik, and Keith Burns to develop his new album under Universal Music Australia's banner.

Discography

Albums

Awards and nominations

ARIA Music Awards
The ARIA Music Awards are a set of annual ceremonies presented by Australian Recording Industry Association (ARIA), which recognise excellence, innovation, and achievement across all genres of the music of Australia. They commenced in 1987.

! 
|-
| 2018 || Adam & Brooke (with Brooke McClymont) || ARIA Award for Best Country Album ||  ||

Country Music Awards of Australia
The Country Music Awards of Australia is an annual awards night held in January during the Tamworth Country Music Festival. Celebrating recording excellence in the Australian country music industry. They commenced in 1973.
 

! 
|-
|rowspan="4"| 2019 ||rowspan="2"| "Train Wreck" (Adam Eckersley & Brooke McClymont) || Song of the Year||  ||rowspan="4"| 
|-
| Single of the Year ||   
|-
| Adam & Brooke  ||  Group or Duo of the Year ||   
|-
| Adam & Brooke (with Brooke McClymont) || Contemporary Country Album of the Year ||  
|- 
|rowspan="1"|  2021 || "Remedy" (with Brad Cox) ||Vocal Collaboration of the Year ||  || 
|-
|rowspan="4"| 2023 || "Memory Lane" (with Brooke McClymont) || Single of the Year ||  ||rowspan="4"| 
|-
| "Star of the Show" (with Brooke McClymont) (Directed by Brad Murnane) || Video of the Year || 
|-
| "Star of the Show" (with Brooke McClymont) || Song of the Year || 
|-
| Brooke McClymont & Adam Eckersley || Group or Duo of the Year ||

See also
 Adam Eckersley Band

References

External links 

APRA Award winners
Australian guitarists
Living people
People from Grafton, New South Wales
1982 births
Australian Idol participants
21st-century Australian singers
21st-century guitarists